Barker House is a historic home located near Henderson, Vance County, North Carolina.  It was built about 1764, with an addition built about 1774.  It is a -story, five bay, single pile, heavy timber frame dwelling. The interior has a hall-parlor plan. It was renovated in 2014, with a rebuilt full-width engaged front porch.

It was listed on the National Register of Historic Places in 2014.

References

Houses on the National Register of Historic Places in North Carolina
Houses completed in 1764
Houses in Vance County, North Carolina
National Register of Historic Places in Vance County, North Carolina
1764 establishments in North Carolina